The Gamma Alpha Graduate Scientific Society is a non-profit fraternal organization (501(c)(7)) in the United States which fosters interdisciplinary dialogue among graduate students through its local chapters.  The Society's chapters have often been headquartered in chapter houses, akin to residential cooperatives, though there have been many chapters which lacked a chapter house.  Where established, chapter houses have served as venues for the academic talks hosted by the Society.  More informally, the shared living space of the Society's houses has provided its members with a forum for a regular exchange of ideas across disciplines—over breakfast or dinner, for example, or a game of chess.

Origin and Mission
The Society was founded in 1899 as the Gamma Alpha Graduate Scientific Fraternity in Ithaca, NY by graduate students in the biological sciences at Cornell University.  Its purpose was an interdisciplinary one with respect to the sciences:  to stimulate “mutual interest” among graduate students from “the various scientific departments of Cornell University.” 
In time, it expanded to more than a dozen chapters across the country and boasted a membership of “more than 10,000 men.”

In 1963, it formally changed its name to the Gamma Alpha Graduate Scientific Society, in part to further differentiate itself from undergraduate fraternities.  Originally, the Society was a scientific fraternity exclusively for men, but local chapters (such as Missouri's) admitted women by 1968. 
Other chapter houses (Chicago, Cornell and Ohio) began to admit women and students in disciplines other than the sciences in 1972, 
with the rest (Ann Arbor) following suit the following year. 
Currently, the University of Illinois is the only local chapter that remains an all-male fraternity. Although the makeup of the organization has thus changed greatly since its inception, it is still dedicated to promoting an interdisciplinary fellowship among graduate students, in large part through its cooperative living arrangements.  Its motto remains Γνωθι την 'Αληθειαν (Know the truth).

The significance of Gamma Alpha's motto as well as the symbolism of its insignia used to be revealed to new members in their initiation ceremony.  After presenting the candidates with their certificates of membership, the president of the chapter would inform them that:The letters  denote our motto: Gnothe ten Aletheian – KNOW THE TRUTH.  The wings and star on our Society Emblem, which all of you are now entitled to wear, signify PROGRESS and ATTAINMENT.  The four notches in that Emblem commemorate the four original Chapters:  CORNELL, JOHNS HOPKINS, CHICAGO, AND DARTMOUTH.Nowadays, however, the Society has no such initiation ceremony, though the motto and insignia have been retained.  Most ceremonies of this sort—another would be the singing of the fraternity's song at the end of chapter meetings—appear to have been dropped with the organization's metamorphosis from a fraternity into a type of fraternal, co-ed cooperative.

Activities
 A historical survey of Gamma Alphans' activities is requested here.  (volunteers: see the discussion page)

Publications
 An overview of The Gamma Alpha Record and Newsletter is requested here.  (volunteers: see the discussion page)

Chapters
The Society presently has four active chapters—in Ithaca, NY (Cornell University), Chicago (University of Chicago), and Ann Arbor, MI (University of Michigan) as well as at Champaign-Urbana, IL (University of Illinois).  None of them is legally affiliated with its members’ home academic institution(s).  The chapter in Chicago, for example, bears no legal connection with the University of Chicago, and indeed, its members may attend other universities in the vicinity.  Still, for the sake of convenience, each chapter is designated by the name of its logical academic institution:  Cornell, Chicago and Ann Arbor respectively.

Cornell
The Cornell Chapter was the founding branch of the organization and contributed a number of illustrious members like Hans Bethe, the German-American physicist who won the Nobel Prize in Physics in 1967 for his work on the theory of stellar nucleosynthesis.

Locations
The chapter continues to offer housing to graduate students in the sciences at its house at 116 Oak Avenue overlooking the beautiful Cascadilla Gorge.

Chicago

Origin 
The Chicago Chapter was the second chapter of the Society to be established (excluding the chapters of the Alpha Delta Epsilon Scientific Fraternity which, though they existed prior to the Chicago Chapter, merged with the Society shortly after the latter's establishment).  According to early records, it was through the “untiring zeal” of F. H. Krecker and R. E. Sheldon of the Cornell Chapter that graduate students in the sciences at the University of Chicago petitioned Gamma Alpha for a charter in December 1907.  The charter was granted on February 8, 1908, and the chapter officially installed on the same day.

Locations
The chapter has been housed in six different locations in its nearly one hundred years of existence in Hyde Park, Chicago. (1) In its first year, the chapter secured rooms that were “modestly though neatly furnished” on the first floor of 5724 S. Drexel Avenue. (2) Within a year, it had already found a house of its own at 5731 S. Monroe Avenue (renamed Kenwood Avenue in 1915), where “almost all” of its 24 members lodged. (3) By October, 1915, the chapter had moved again, this time to a house that would affectionately come to be called the “Blackstone Castle,” at 5520 S. Blackstone Avenue, where “eighteen to twenty-odd men” were put up in seven bedrooms. (4) Within seven years—by October 1922—the chapter had moved back to Kenwood Avenue, making its home in the house (5733) next to its former residence (5731). (5) And in the first quarter of 1938, the chapter relocated to 5735 S. Woodlawn Avenue, “the most beat up house on Woodlawn” with a “poor porch” that remained, “well, darn poor.” (6) Finally, in a forced move in the latter half of 1958, the chapter settled into its longest-lived home to date, the former residence of the famous American sociologist, David Riesman, at 5621 S. University Avenue, across the street from the campus (see below).

Challenges 
The chapter fell on especially tough times and nearly lost its housing both during World War II and with the sale of its house to the University of Chicago in 1958.  Like many residential institutions during  World War II, the Chicago Chapter lost many men to the armed forces and was hard pressed to fill the house with enough members to make ends meet. Supplies like roofing tiles were “unattainable at any price” that the chapter could afford and the pipes also fell into disrepair, dripping “dismally” through the winter of 1943. The house's future seemed “none too bright” to its members and was in fact so uncertain that “all efforts” were “being made to forestall a possible closure.”

Such a closure was all but certain in 1957 when an expanding University of Chicago arranged to buy the chapter house and replace it with a seminary dorm.  For its part, the local corporation governing the house planned to use the monies from the sale to “establish a fellowship-loan fund,” but at the cost of permanently closing the chapter house and displacing its resident members.  A hard battle was subsequently fought by the chapter's active members, with the support of the national organization, to get the local corporation to relocate rather than abolish the chapter house.  Eventually, the corporation capitulated and, with help from the university, relocated the chapter in 1958 to 5621 S. University Avenue, the “magnificent residence which is the present home of ΓΑ.”

At Present 
The Chicago Chapter has institutionalized in its “House Rules” the membership changes which were ushered in the late 1960s and early 1970s.  In recruiting new members for its 15 rooms, it now seeks to maintain a balance between the sexes and to admit students from as diverse a set of academic fields as possible.  It has thus come to conceive of itself more as a graduate student cooperative than a scientific fraternity, though it remains both active in the national organization and invested in the welfare of its sister chapters.  For more information about the present activities of the chapter, its recruitment of new members and alumni contacts, visit the chapter's homepage.

Ann Arbor 
See current house information here: http://www.gammaalphacoop.wordpress.com

The Gamma Alpha chapter of Ann Arbor first bought a house near the North Engels building. In 1949, Gamma Alpha moved to the current location in the southwest area of the city, into a house that was built in 1923 as a family residence. During the early years, GA Ann Arbor housed up to 40 male Chemistry graduate students. This luckily changed over time—the house now offers single rooms for 13 graduate students, both female and male and from all departments. The house has a lively and multicultural community, and besides some tightly organized house meetings, the members cook together, fill out crosswords, play board games, sled (in winter), brew beer, bake bread, repair the house, and engage in many other activities.

The University of Illinois at Champaign-Urbana

Instituted on December 16, 1908, a residential chapter has continuously been located at the University of Illinois, and has been situated at 807 W Nevada Street, Urbana, Illinois 61801 for approximately the last 80 years. The Illinois chapter is a co-ed organisation and amongst notable alumni are Polykarp Kusch and Arnold Beckman. Initiated May 25, 1932, Polykarp Kusch won the Nobel prize in physics in 1955. Arnold Orville Beckman, initiated December 1922, was the inventor of the first pH meter and founder of the first silicon transistor company in California (thus giving birth to Silicon valley).

The Illinois chapter still encourages application from graduate students attending the University of Illinois, and has opened membership capabilities to students in areas other than exclusively scientific disciplines.

Gamma Alpha websites
 Cornell: Cornell chapter website
 Chicago:  Chicago chapter website
 Ann Arbor: Michigan chapter website

Notes

Scientific organizations based in the United States
Non-profit organizations based in New York (state)
1899 establishments in New York (state)
Student organizations established in 1899